Perry High School may refer to:
Perry High School (Gilbert, Arizona) — Gilbert, Arizona
Perry High School (Georgia) — Perry, Georgia
Perry High School (Iowa) — Perry, Iowa
Perry High School (Michigan) — Perry, Michigan
Perry High School (New York) — Perry, New York
Perry High School (Lima, Ohio) — Lima, Ohio
Perry High School (Stark County, Ohio) — Perry Township, Ohio
Perry High School (Perry, Ohio) — Perry, Ohio
Perry High School (Oklahoma) — Perry, Oklahoma

It may also refer to:
Perry-Casa High School — Casa, Arkansas
Griggsville-Perry High School — Griggsville, Illinois
Mary B. Perry High School — Camarillo, California
Perry Meridian High School — Indianapolis, Indiana
Perry Central Junior-Senior High School — Leopold, Indiana
Perry Lecompton High School — Perry, Kansas
Perry County Central High School — Hazard, Kentucky
Perry Hall High School — Baltimore, Maryland
Perry Central High School — New Augusta, Mississippi
Fayetteville-Perry High School — Fayetteville, Ohio
Port Perry High School — Port Perry, Ontario
West Perry High School — Elliottsburg, Pennsylvania
Commodore Perry Junior/Senior High School — Hadley, Pennsylvania
Perry Traditional Academy — Pittsburgh, Pennsylvania
Perry County High School — Linden, Tennessee